Taylor County is a county in the U.S. state of West Virginia. As of the 2020 census, the population was 16,705. Its county seat is Grafton. The county was formed in 1844 and named for Senator John Taylor of Caroline.

Taylor County is part of the Clarksburg, WV Micropolitan Statistical Area.

History
This area was populated by the Adena culture in the Pre-Columbian Woodland period of the Native Americans in the United States.

Some of the first Europeans to visit the area are thought to have been British Army deserters from Fort Pitt, who reportedly fled their post in 1761 during the French and Indian War and roamed northwestern Virginia for several years thereafter. A European trader with the Hudson's Bay Company reportedly set foot in these lands as early as 1764.

Pruntytown is the oldest (ca. 1798) known white settlement in what is now Taylor County. Initially known as Cross Roads, on January 1, 1801, it was renamed Williamsport in honor of Abraham Williams, a longtime resident. The name was changed again on January 23, 1845, to honor pioneer settler John Prunty, Sr (1745-1823) and son David. This town served as the county seat of government from the county's founding in 1844 until a county election in 1878 moved that honor to Grafton, West Virginia.

The county was established by the Virginia General Assembly on January 19, 1844. It was formed out of parts of Barbour, Harrison, and Marion counties in Virginia. Most historians think the county was named after John Taylor (1753-1824) of Caroline County, Virginia, while a minority believe it was named after Zachary Taylor. Fifteen justices were appointed by Governor James McDowell to organize the newly formed county: John Asbury, Frederick Burdett, Dr. Joseph L. Carr, John Cather, John A. Guseman, Nathan Hall, Calder Haymond, Absalom Knotts, John Leeper, Charles W. Newlon, Jonathan Poe, Robert Reed, Joshua A. Robinson, William A. Rogers, and Benjamin Sinclair.

On June 20, 1863, at the height of the Civil War, Taylor was one of fifty Virginia counties that were admitted to the Union as the state of West Virginia.  Later that year, the counties were divided into civil townships, with the intention of encouraging local government.  This proved impractical in the heavily rural state, and in 1872 the townships were converted into magisterial districts.  Taylor County was initially divided into nine townships: Booths Creek, Clay, Court House, Fetterman, Flemington, Grafton, Haymond, Union, and Webster.  Grafton Township was co-extensive with the town of Grafton.

In 1871, Union Township was annexed by Grafton Township; the following year, Clay and Webster Townships were annexed by Court House Township, Haymond was annexed by Fetterman, and the five remaining townships were converted to magisterial districts.  In the 1880s, Knottsville District was created from the part of Grafton District that lay outside the town of Grafton.  Except for minor adjustments, the six historic districts remained largely unchanged for the next ninety years, until in the 1970s they were consolidated into three new magisterial districts: Central, Eastern, and Western.  In the 1990s, Central District was renamed, becoming Tygart.

The West Virginia Equal Suffrage Association was founded in November 1895 at the Taylor County Courthouse after a meeting called by leaders of the National American Woman Suffrage Association.
 
Anna Jarvis, the founder of the Mother's Day, was a native of Taylor County, which is now home to the International Mother's Day Shrine.

Geography
It is the fifth-smallest county in West Virginia by area.

Major highways
 U.S. 50
 U.S. 119
 U.S. 250
 WV 76
 WV 310

Adjacent counties
Monongalia County (north)
Preston County (east)
Barbour County (south)
Harrison County (west)
Marion County (northwest)

Demographics

2000 census
As of the census of 2000, there were 16,089 people, 6,320 households, and 4,487 families living in the county.  The population density was 93 people per square mile (36/km2).  There were 7,125 housing units at an average density of 41 per square mile (16/km2).  The racial makeup of the county was 98.07% White, 0.83% Black or African American, 0.19% Native American, 0.17% Asian, 0.04% Pacific Islander, 0.06% from other races, and 0.63% from two or more races.  0.59% of the population were Hispanic or Latino of any race.

There were 6,320 households, out of which 30.90% had children under the age of 18 living with them, 56.40% were married couples living together, 10.90% had a female householder with no husband present, and 29.00% were non-families. 25.50% of all households were made up of individuals, and 12.60% had someone living alone who was 65 years of age or older.  The average household size was 2.47 and the average family size was 2.95.

In the county, the population was spread out, with 22.90% under the age of 18, 7.90% from 18 to 24, 28.50% from 25 to 44, 24.90% from 45 to 64, and 15.80% who were 65 years of age or older.  The median age was 39 years. For every 100 females, there were 95.70 males.  For every 100 females age 18 and over, there were 92.90 males.

The median income for a household in the county was $27,124, and the median income for a family was $32,222. Males had a median income of $29,349 versus $20,116 for females. The per capita income for the county was $13,681.  About 15.30% of families and 20.30% of the population were below the poverty line, including 27.00% of those under age 18 and 16.10% of those age 65 or over.

2010 census
As of the 2010 United States census, there were 16,895 people, 6,778 households, and 4,703 families living in the county. The racial makeup of the county was 97.5% white, 0.7% black or African American, 0.4% Asian, 0.2% American Indian, 0.1% from other races, and 1.0% from two or more races. Those of Hispanic or Latino origin made up 0.8% of the population. In terms of ancestry, 26.1% were German, 22.9% were Irish, 11.3% were American, 10.3% were English, 7.2% were Italian, and 5.1% were Dutch.

Of the 6,778 households, 29.3% had children under the age of 18 living with them, 53.6% were married couples living together, 10.6% had a female householder with no husband present, 30.6% were non-families, and 26.1% of all households were made up of individuals. The average household size was 2.42 and the average family size was 2.89. The median age was 42.3 years.

The median income for a household in the county was $36,956 and the median income for a family was $45,620. Males had a median income of $38,085 versus $26,292 for females. The per capita income for the county was $18,562. About 11.3% of families and 15.8% of the population were below the poverty line, including 21.6% of those under age 18 and 16.0% of those age 65 or over.

Politics

Communities

City
Grafton (county seat)

Town
Flemington

Magisterial districts

Current
Eastern
Tygart
Western

Historic
Booths Creek
Court House
Fetterman
Flemington
Grafton
Knottsville

Unincorporated communities

Astor
Belgium
Blueville
Brownlow
Elliotsville
Fetterman
Hardman (partial)
Hepzibah
Knottsville
Lucretia
McGee
Meadland
Millertown
Oreide
Park View
Pruntytown
Rosemont
Sandy
Santiago
Simpson
South Grafton
Tappan
Thornton
Webster
Wendel
West Grafton
Westerman

See also
National Register of Historic Places listings in Taylor County, West Virginia
 Pruntytown Wildlife Management Area
 Tygart Lake State Park
 Valley Falls State Park

Footnotes

References

Further reading
Brinkman, Charles. A History of Taylor County. Grafton: Taylor County Historical & Genealogical Society, [Reprint, 1989] (originally serialized in The Grafton (W. Va.) Sentinel from April 18, 1939, to June 29, 1942). 
McDevitt, Wayne F. Grafton and the B&O Railroad. A History of Taylor County. Parsons: McClain, 1986.

External links
West Virginia Archives and History references for Taylor County, West Virginia
Taylor County Public Library

 
Northwestern Turnpike
1844 establishments in Virginia
Populated places established in 1844
Clarksburg micropolitan area
Counties of Appalachia